The Crazy Nights World Tour was a concert tour by American hard rock band Kiss in support of their fourteenth studio album Crazy Nights.

Background
Based on how successful the single "Crazy Crazy Nights" was in the United Kingdom, the group had performed on the Monsters of Rock Festival at Castle Donington in England, performing alongside Guns N' Roses, David Lee Roth, Iron Maiden and Megadeth. Simmons was set to audition as a villain in the 1989 film Licence to Kill but had dropped out from auditioning, citing commitments to the band touring in Europe.

In the tour program for the band's final tour, Stanley reflected on the tour:

Reception
Garth Trimble, a reporter from the Spokane Daily Chronicle who had attended the performance in Spokane, had opened his review with a headline that the band had 'staged a circus, but lacked excitement'. He noted on the set design being simple as well as the members performing well, but not outstanding. He however, noted that the show had lacked an explosive energy, and had noted on the awful sound of the Coliseum, which he stated was typical. In a closing statement, he said that the group's music wasn't strong enough to carry a show on its own, stating that it was perhaps time for the members to grow up.

Aaron Roberts, a staff writer from the Observer-Reporter, had attended the Pittsburgh performance, gave the show a positive review. He opened by stating that the band had thrilled the audience with a blend of both classic and new songs. He praised Kulick on his speed and skill during his guitar solo as well as stating how equally impressed he was on Carr's drum solo. He noted on the audience being a blend of teenagers and young adults, who previously got into Kiss as teens - citing their reactions that it didn't matter that 'only half of the original group' was performing the classic songs, as well as the cheers and the 'glow of hundreds of lighters' to bring the band back on stage for an encore.

Setlist
These are example setlists for what was played at a show, and may not represent the majority of shows on the tour.

1987 North American Setlist
"Love Gun"
"Cold Gin"
"Bang Bang You"
"Fits Like a Glove"
"Crazy Crazy Nights"
"No, No, No"
"War Machine"
"Reason to Live"
"Heaven's on Fire"
"I Love It Loud"
"Lick It Up"
"Rock and Roll All Nite"
Encore
"Tears Are Falling"
"Detroit Rock City"

1988 North American Setlist
"Love Gun"
"Cold Gin"
"Bang Bang You"
"Fits Like a Glove"
"Crazy Crazy Nights"
"War Machine"
"Reason to Live"
"Heaven's on Fire"
"I Love It Loud"
"Lick It Up"
"Shout It Out Loud"
Encore
"Rock and Roll All Nite"
"Tears Are Falling"
"Detroit Rock City"

Japanese Setlist
"Love Gun"
"Cold Gin"
"Bang Bang You"
"Calling Dr. Love"
"Fits Like a Glove"
"Crazy Crazy Nights"
"No, No, No"
"Reason to Live"
"Heaven's on Fire"
"War Machine"
"Tears Are Falling"
"I Love It Loud"
"Lick It Up"
"Black Diamond"
"I Was Made for Lovin' You"
"Shout It Out Loud"
Encore
"Strutter"
"Rock and Roll All Nite"
"Detroit Rock City"

European Setlist
"Love Gun"
"Fits Like a Glove"
"Heaven's on Fire"
"Cold Gin"
"Black Diamond"
"Bang Bang You"
"No, No, No"
"Firehouse"
"Crazy Crazy Nights"
"I Was Made for Lovin' You"
"Deuce"
"Reason to Live"
"Tears Are Falling"
"I Love It Loud"
"Strutter"
"Shout It Out Loud"
Encore
"Lick It Up"
"Rock and Roll All Nite"
"Detroit Rock City"

Tour dates

Box office score data

Personnel 
 Paul Stanley – vocals, rhythm guitar
 Gene Simmons – vocals, bass
 Eric Carr – drums, vocals
 Bruce Kulick – lead guitar, backing vocals
Additional musician
 Gary Corbett – keyboards

References

Sources

1987 concert tours
1988 concert tours
Kiss (band) concert tours